The Devon Women's cricket team is the women's representative cricket team for the English historic county of Devon. They play their home games at various grounds across the county, including Knighthayes Court, Bolham and the County Ground, Exeter. They are captained by Steph Hutchins. In 2019, they played in Division Two of the final season of the Women's County Championship, and have since competed in the Women's Twenty20 Cup. They are partnered with the regional side Western Storm.

History
Devon Women joined the County Challenge Cup in 2005, finishing 2nd in their group in their first season. In 2008, their first season in the Women's County Championship proper, they were promoted from Division 5 South & West, winning all four of their games. After being promoted to Division 2 in 2011, they have remained there ever since, achieving their best finish of 3rd in 2012, 2014 and 2017, helped by standout performances from players such as Rosalie Birch, Jodie Dibble and Caitlin O'Keefe. Devon joined the Women's Twenty20 Cup in its inaugural season, 2009, winning Division 4 with two out of three wins that year. From 2015, when the competition first moved to a national format, until 2018, Devon played in Division 3: they were promoted in 2018, topping Division 3A, and played in Division 2 in 2019. In 2021, they competed in the South West Group of the Twenty20 Cup, finishing 2nd with 4 wins. In 2022, they won Group 8 of the Twenty20 Cup, topping the group before emerging victorious on Finals Day, beating Cornwall in the final.

Players

Current squad
Based on appearances in the 2022 season.

Notable players
Players who have played for Devon and played internationally are listed below, in order of first international appearance (given in brackets):

 Aimee Watkins (2002)
 Rosalie Birch (2003)
 Olivia Anderson (2008)
 Heather Knight (2010)
 Felicity Leydon-Davis (2014)
 Jodie Cook (2014)

Seasons

Women's County Championship

Women's Twenty20 Cup

Honours
 Women's Twenty20 Cup:
 Group winners (1) – 2022

See also

 Devon County Cricket Club
 Western Storm

References

Cricket in Devon
Women's cricket teams in England
Devon County Cricket Club